Shopkeeping Goddesses or Shopkeeper Goddesses are the goddesses known for keeping different market shops in Meitei mythology and religion (Sanamahism) of Ancient Kangleipak (Antique Manipur). Different stories have different answers to how many shopkeeping goddesses there are. They are Cheng Leima, Chinga Leima, Heipok Leima, Hei Leima, Laa Leima, Phu Leima, Pishum Leima, Thangching Leima, Waisheng Leima, Waithou Leima and Waal Leima.

List

See also 
 Emoinu, Goddess of wealth and prosperity 
 Phouleima, Goddess of agriculture, paddy and rice

References

External links 

   
   
   
   
   
 

Meitei deities